Acrotrichis is a genus of beetles belonging to the family Ptiliidae.

The genus was described in 1848 by Victor Motschulsky.

The genus has cosmopolitan distribution.

Selected species
 Acrotrichis africana Johnson, 1969
 Acrotrichis australica (Deane, 1930)
 Acrotrichis cervina (Deane, 1931)
 Acrotrichis discoloroides Johnson, 1969
 Acrotrichis grandis (Deane, 1932)
 Acrotrichis insularis (Mäklin, 1852)
 Acrotrichis josephi (A.Matthews, 1872)
 Acrotrichis norfolkensis (Deane, 1931)
 Acrotrichis quadrilatica (Deane, 1932)
 Acrotrichis walkomi (Deane, 1931)

References

Ptiliidae
Taxa named by Victor Motschulsky